YouTube Premium, formerly known as YouTube Red, is a subscription service that provides advertising-free streaming of all videos hosted by YouTube, offline play and background playback of videos on mobile devices, access to advertising-free music streaming through YouTube Music, and access to "YouTube Original" series and films. Following is a list of all available, upcoming, and abandoned "YouTube Original" films and documentaries.

Original programming

Drama

Comedy

Adult animation

Anime

Kids and family

Unscripted

Docu-series

Reality

Non-English language
These shows were created by YouTube and are spoken entirely or almost entirely in a non-English language.

French

German

Hindi

Japanese

Korean

Portuguese

Spanish

Continuations

Original films

Drama

Comedy

Documentary

Acquisitions

Upcoming original programming

Original series

Ordered

In development

Abandoned projects

References

External links
 

 
 
YouTube-related lists
YouTube Red